Norske Folk was a life insurance company based in Norway.

It was founded in 1917. In 1984 it started a cooperation with Norges Brannkasse named UNI Forsikring. In 1989 Norske Folk was redesigned into a public company named UNI Liv. In 1991 the entire UNI Forsikring was merged with Storebrand.

References

Insurance companies of Norway

Financial services companies established in 1917
1917 establishments in Norway
Financial services companies disestablished in 1991
1991 disestablishments in Norway